Route 90 is a highway in southwest Missouri.  Its eastern terminus is at Route 37 in Washburn; its western terminus is at Route 43 northeast of Southwest City.

Route description
Route 90 is a two-lane highway for its entire length and is in rugged areas, very hilly and very curvy.

The highway begins at Missouri Route 43. When it reaches Missouri Route 59, it has a brief concurrency and the road passes under the bluffs. At Noel, the highway leaves the duplex and continues east. Halfway between the City of Noel and US 71 is a diamond interchange with I-49. Further east, the highway intersects the current US 71. At Jane, Route 90 crosses an older alignment of U.S. Route 71. About 15 miles (24 km) west of its terminus is an intersection with Route E, in which the primary highway (Route 90) stops for a secondary road (Route E), a very rare and possibly unique occurrence in the state. The route ends at Missouri State Route 37 in Washburn.

History 
Route 90 was one of the original 1922 state highways.  Its eastern terminus was at Route 1 in Noel and its western terminus was at the corner of Missouri, Oklahoma, and Arkansas near Southwest City.  It was eventually extended down Routes P and K to Washburn.

Major intersections

References 

090
Transportation in McDonald County, Missouri
Transportation in Barry County, Missouri